Marc Herremans (Merksem, 19 December 1973) is a Belgian triathlete and motivational speaker.

Triathlete
Because of his 4th-place finish in the Ironman of Australia, he secured a place for the 2001 Ironman World Championship held in Hawaii. On 6 October 2001, he finished in 6th place in the Ironman of Hawaii, widely regarded as the toughest triathlon competition in the world. Marc had only been training for triathlons since 1998, and he was considered by his trainers to have an enormous potential. He was expected to compete for one of the top three positions the following year.

Paralysis
Unfortunately, on 28 January 2002, every dream of winning the Ironman was crushed when Marc, during bike training in Lanzarote, fell at a dangerous bend, landed on rocks and broke his back. Marc was immediately brought to a hospital, yet the doctors quickly diagnosed that Marc had suffered total paralysis from his stomach to his feet, and would be forced to live in a wheelchair for the rest of his life.

Remarkably, only 3 months after the accident, Marc refused to be discouraged and began training for the Ironman Championship as a wheelchair athlete. In 2002, he was elected by the Belgian press as sports personality of the year. He earned the nickname "Mad Max" due to his determination and unwillingness to give up.

Wheelchair athlete
Marc participated in the Ironman of Hawaii in 2002, only 10 months after his accident. He participated again every following year. In 2006, he finally succeeded in his goal: he was the first wheelchair athlete to arrive at the finish of the Ironman of Hawaii (ironically, he didn't receive any prize money, because wheelchair athletes do not receive prizes).

To Walk Again
In 2003, he started a foundation called "To Walk Again" that supports other disabled people, with such efforts as creating a sports centre for disabled people, and investing in bone marrow research. Marc was especially inspired when he met disabled celebrity Christopher Reeve.

In October 2007, Herremans became the first person to complete the Crocodile Trophy with a hand bike. The Crocodile Trophy is one of the world's hardest mountain bike races, traversing part of Northern Australia.

Book and movie 
Marc Herremans has written a book and helped in the making of a film about his life. The book, the film and Marc's foundation are all titled To Walk Again. The film, directed by Stijn Coninx with a soundtrack  provided by Ozark Henry, follows Marc in both his effort to win the Ironman and to help disabled people with their lives, by encouraging them through his To Walk Again Foundation.

References

External links 
Official Website

Belgian male triathletes
1973 births
Living people
People from Merksem
Sportspeople from Antwerp